Davina Williams (born 30 November 1985) is an Australian freestyle skier and graphic designer. She competed at the 2014 Winter Olympics in Sochi, in women's halfpipe.

References

External links

1985 births
Living people
Freestyle skiers at the 2014 Winter Olympics
Australian female freestyle skiers
Olympic freestyle skiers of Australia